Farina, formerly Farina Town, is a town and locality in the Australian state of South Australia.   At the 2006 census, Farina had a population of 55.

History

Originally called The Gums or Government Gums, Farina was settled in 1878 by optimistic farmers hoping that rain follows the plough. The town was the railhead for a time until 1884 before the railway was extended to Marree. During the wet years of the 1880s, plans were laid out for a town with 432 ¼-acre blocks. It was believed that it would be good for growing wheat and barley, however normal rainfall is nowhere near enough to grow these crops. Several silver and copper mines were dug in the surrounding area.

Farina grew to reach a peak population of approximately 600 in the late 1800s.  In its heyday, the town had two hotels (the Transcontinental and the Exchange) and an underground bakery, a bank, two breweries, a general store, an Anglican church, five blacksmiths, a school and a brothel. In 1909, a  iron meteorite was discovered north-east of the town.

Today nothing but stone ruins and the elevated railway water tank remain of the township. The post office closed in the 1960s and the railway line closed in the 1980s.

The town hasn't been inhabited since 1967, with the closest residents now living at Farina station, visible to the west of the town.  A bush camping area is maintained by the owners of Farina station.

In 2008 Farina Restoration Group was formed, and in May 2009, 30 people attended a 14-day restoration program at Farina.

Volunteer efforts have been made to restore the town, including the repair of the bakery and the addition of informational signs.

Cemeteries

The town's cemetery is located a few kilometres away via a signposted track. Of interest is the Afghan corner of the cemetery which contains several headstones with both English and Arabic inscriptions, plus several headstones without inscriptions, marking the resting place of former Farina residents of Afghan origin who were involved in or connected to the Afghan camel trains which used to provide transport services before the railway was extended. All the gravestones face Mecca in the Islamic tradition.

First World War enlistments 

During the First World War, 33 men who were born in Farina enlisted for the duration of the war and for four months after its end. All of them were volunteers. Of the total, five were killed in action, ten were wounded, and one died at sea en route to England. One of the youngest Farina residents to enlist was 15-year-old William James Denham Robinson, who used an alias of Charles Robison; he served in both world wars.

World War II 

During World War II, 35 men born in Farina enlisted. Of those, nine served in the Royal Australian Air Force. The first man enlisted on 18 October 1939 and the last man on 15 March 1945. The youngest was 18 when he enlisted and the oldest was 45. Three men were killed in action and a fourth died during his service in the army. The last Farina man was discharged in October 1948.

Climate
Farina has a hot desert climate,  although the temperature station has not been in operation since 1939.

See also
Farina (disambiguation)

References
Notes

Citations

External links 

 Farina: Ruined Ghost Town – Oodnadatta Track, South Australia
 Volunteers bring ghost town back to life
 Postcards television show about South Australia

Towns in South Australia
Far North (South Australia)
Places in the unincorporated areas of South Australia
Populated places established in 1878
1878 establishments in Australia